Dr. Ulhas Patil Medical College and Hospital, Jalgaon is a full-fledged medical college in Jalgaon, Maharashtra. The college imparts the degree Bachelor of Medicine and Bachelor of Surgery (MBBS). It is recognised by the Medical Council of India.

Selection to the college is done on the basis of merit through the National Eligibility and Entrance Test. Yearly undergraduate student intake is 100.

References

External links 
https://www.dupmc.ac.in/

Medical colleges in Maharashtra
Universities and colleges in Maharashtra
Affiliates of Maharashtra University of Health Sciences
Educational institutions established in 2008
2008 establishments in Maharashtra